Strømsgodset Toppfotball is a Norwegian professional football club based in Gulskogen, Drammen, that competes in the Eliteserien. It is the elite football section of the multi-sports club Strømsgodset IF.

The multi-sports club was founded 10 February 1907, but the football team first found success in the late 1960s and early 1970s. Led by the young striker Steinar Pettersen and his team-mates, the «Rødgata Boys» (nicknamed after the street most of them lived on), Strømsgodset got promoted from the fourth tier to the top flight in just a few years. The team then went on to win the top division in 1970 and the Norwegian Cup in 1969, 1970, 1973.

In the following decades, the club struggled more. However, the relegation to the third tier in 1986 was a turning point for the football team, and the club was promoted to the top flight again in 1989. In 1991, the club secured its fourth Norwegian Cup, and a turbulent decade followed, with promotions and relegations. In 1997 they lost the cup final, but secured bronze medals in the league.

After five years in the second tier, the economic situation had become a problem for the club, almost bringing it to bankruptcy in 2005. However, local investors saved the club, and this was the start of the second successful period. The club was promoted to Tippeligaen, won the Norwegian cup in 2010, and gradually grew into one of the best teams in Norway. A 2nd place in 2012 was followed by another championship in 2013, the club's second league title.

Home ground 

Strømsgodset Toppfotball play their home games at Marienlyst Stadion. The stadium has been rebuilt several times, most recently with a new south end ("Klokkesvingen") in 2014. There, safe standing (rail seats) was installed, which increased the capacity to 8,935 in matches where standing supporters are allowed. Safe standing has also been installed in the north end. When an all-seating stadium is required, the capacity is 8,060.

Record attendance for the club is 16,687 against Rosenborg BK in 1969. However, local rivals Mjøndalen holds the all-time record from a Cup semi final tie versus Viking in 1949, by approximately another thousand.

The stadium often goes under the name of "Gamle Gress" (meaning "Old turf")

Field measurements are 106 m x 68 m.

The turf has now been replaced with an artificial grass surface.

Marienlyst Stadium has frequently been used in Norway U21 International matches, and on 16 October 2012 when Norway U21 beat France U21 5–3 at Marienlyst and qualified for the 2013 UEFA European Under-21 Football Championship, after France won 1–0 in the first play-off match.

Honours 

Eliteserien
Champions (2): 1970, 2013
Runners-up: 2012, 2015
Third place: 1969, 1972, 1997

Norwegian Cup
Winners (5): 1969, 1970, 1973, 1991, 2010
Runners-up: 1993, 1997, 2018

1. divisjon
Winners (1): 2006

Strømsgodset in Europe 

Notes

Recent history 
{|class="wikitable"
|-bgcolor="#efefef"
! Season
! 
! Pos.
! Pl.
! W
! D
! L
! GS
! GA
! P
!Cup
!Notes
|-
|2009
|Tippeligaen
|align=right |12
|align=right|30||align=right|10||align=right|6||align=right|14
|align=right|40||align=right|42||align=right|36
||Second round
||
|-
|2010
|Tippeligaen
|align=right |7
|align=right|30||align=right|13||align=right|4||align=right|13
|align=right|51||align=right|59||align=right|43
|bgcolor=gold|Winner
|
|-
|2011 
|Tippeligaen
|align=right |8
|align=right|30||align=right|12||align=right|9||align=right|9
|align=right|44||align=right|43||align=right|45
||Fourth round
|
|-
|2012
|Tippeligaen
|align=right bgcolor=silver|2
|align=right|30||align=right|17||align=right|7||align=right|6
|align=right|62||align=right|40||align=right|58
||Quarter-final
|
|-
|2013
|Tippeligaen
|align=right bgcolor=gold|1
|align=right|30||align=right|19||align=right|6||align=right|5
|align=right|66||align=right|26||align=right|63
||Second round
|
|-
|2014 
|Tippeligaen
|align=right|4
|align=right|30||align=right|15||align=right|5||align=right|10
|align=right|48||align=right|42||align=right|50
||Third round
||
|-
|2015
|Tippeligaen
|align=right bgcolor=silver|2
|align=right|30||align=right|17||align=right|6||align=right|7
|align=right|67||align=right|44||align=right|57
||Third round
||
|-
|2016 
|Tippeligaen
|align=right |7
|align=right|30||align=right|12||align=right|8||align=right|10
|align=right|44||align=right|40||align=right|44
||Semi-Final
||
|-
|2017 
|Eliteserien
|align=right |4
|align=right|30||align=right|14||align=right|8||align=right|8
|align=right|45||align=right|37||align=right|50
||Third round
||
|-
|2018 
|Eliteserien
|align=right |13
|align=right|30||align=right|7||align=right|10||align=right|13
|align=right|46||align=right|48||align=right|31
|bgcolor=silver|Runners-up
||
|-
|2019 
|Eliteserien
|align=right |11
|align=right|30||align=right|8||align=right|8||align=right|14
|align=right|41||align=right|54||align=right|32
||Third round
||
|-
|2020 
|Eliteserien
|align=right |13
|align=right|30||align=right|7||align=right|10||align=right|13
|align=right|41||align=right|57||align=right|31
||Cancelled
||
|-
|2021 
|Eliteserien
|align=right |9
|align=right|30||align=right|9||align=right|9||align=right|12
|align=right|43||align=right|43||align=right|36
||Semi-final
|
|-
|2022 
|Eliteserien
|align=right |12
|align=right|30||align=right|9||align=right|6||align=right|15
|align=right|44||align=right|55||align=right|33
||Second round
|
|}

Players and staff

First team squad

Coaching staff

Administrative staff

Head coaches 

 Yngvar Lindbo-Hansen (1952)
 Karl Olav Dahlbak (1953)
 Johan Wiig (1954)
 Gunnar Hovde (1955–59)
 Kåre Nielsen (1960)
 Erling Carlsen (1961)
 Gunnar Hovde (1962)
 Einar Larsen (1963–66)
 Ragnar Larsen (1967)
 Asmund Sandli (1968)
 Einar Larsen (1969–70)
 Steinar Johansen (1971)
 Knut Osnes (1972)
 Erik Eriksen (1973–74)
 Einar Larsen (1975)
 Thorodd Presberg (1976–77)
 Arild Mathisen (1978)
 Steinar Pettersen (1979)
 Terje Dokken (1980–82)
 Einar Sigmundstad (1983–84)
 Bjørn Odmar Andersen (1985)
 Erik Eriksen (1986)
 Terje Dokken (1987–88)
 Einar Sigmundstad (1989–90)
 Tor Røste Fossen (1991)
 Hallvar Thoresen (1992)
 Dag Vidar Kristoffersen (Jan 1, 1993–Dec 31, 1998)
 Jens Martin Støten (Jan 1, 1999–Dec 31, 1999)
 Arne Dokken (Jan 1, 2000–Dec 31, 2002)
 Vidar Davidsen (2003–04)
 Anders Jacobsen (Jan 1, 2005–Dec 31, 2005)
 Dag Eilev Fagermo (Jan 1, 2006–Dec 31, 2007)
 Ronny Deila (Jan 1, 2008–14)
 David Nielsen (June 7, 2014 – May 26, 2015) 
 Bjørn Petter Ingebretsen (May 26, 2015– Oct 13, 2016)
 Tor Ole Skullerud (Oct 18, 2016 – June 6, 2018)
 Bjørn Petter Ingebretsen (July 30, 2018 – May 15, 2019)
 Henrik Pedersen  (June 20, 2019 – Apr 9, 2021 )
 Håkon Wibe-Lund & Bjørn Petter Ingebretsen (Apr 11, 2021 – Dec 31, 2022)
 Jørgen Isnes (Jan 1, 2023 – Present)

References

External links 

 Godsetunionen – Supporter club

 
Association football clubs established in 1907
1907 establishments in Norway
Football clubs in Norway
Eliteserien clubs
Sport in Buskerud
Sport in Drammen